Steeve Curpanen (born 15 May 1972) is a Mauritian former international footballer who played as a defender. He won eight caps for the Mauritius national football team.

References

 

1972 births
Living people
Mauritian footballers
Mauritius international footballers
Pamplemousses SC players
Association football defenders
AS Rivière du Rempart players